Stefan Szwedowski (26 December 1891, Piotrków - 27 May 1973, Warsaw) was an anarcho-syndicalist activist and a participant in the Warsaw Uprising.

Biography

In October 1939, Szwedowski was one of the founders of the Union of Polish Syndicalists (ZSP), and from 1943 he was the chief secretary of the ZSP. He was also a representative of the Żegota Council to Aid Jews. From 1942, he organized the secret . He fought in the Warsaw Uprising as a lieutenant in the ranks of the 104th Company of Syndicalists.

After the war, he worked together with other syndicalists in the "Word" Publishing Cooperative in Łódź, which operated until 1948, and then in other worker cooperatives. In 1950, the Security Office undertook investigative measures against Szwedowski, to prepare a trial for organizing a "conspiracy in the communist leadership during the Second World War." In July 1953, a decision was made to arrest him. However, there is no information about Szwedowski's stay in prison. In 1973, just before Szwedowski's death, the Ministry of Public Security considered taking steps to take over the archive of the syndicalist movement he owned.

References

Bibliography

 

1891 births
1973 deaths
Association of the Polish Youth "Zet" members
Burials at Powązki Cemetery
Officers of the Order of Polonia Restituta
Polish anarchists
Polish anti-fascists
Polish cooperative organizers
Polish Military Organisation members
Polish resistance members of World War II
Polish trade unionists
Recipients of the Cross of Independence
Recipients of the Cross of Valour (Poland)
Warsaw Uprising insurgents
Żegota members